"Take a Message" is a song written, produced and performed by Remy Shand, issued as the lead single from his debut studio album The Way I Feel. Released in 2001, the song is his only entry to date on the Billboard Hot 100, peaking at #89 in 2002. "Take a Message" was one of the top 25 most played songs on radio in Canada in 2002.

In 2003, the song was nominated for Best Male R&B Vocal Performance and Best R&B Song at the Grammy Awards.

Music video

The official music video for the song was directed by Kedar Massenburg.

Charts

Weekly charts

Year-end charts

References

External links

 

2001 debut singles
Motown singles
Music videos directed by Kedar Massenburg
Remy Shand songs
Song recordings produced by Remy Shand
Songs written by Remy Shand
Universal Records singles
2001 songs
Contemporary R&B ballads
2000s ballads